Vladimir Leonidovich Pettay (8 May 1973 – 20 June 2011) was a Russian international football referee and former player.

Pettay was born in Pudozh.  In 1992, he played 24 matches as a midfielder for second-league FC Karelia Petrozavodsk, scoring two goals. He later played for the first-league futsal team GTS Petrozavodsk. He began his career as a referee in 1996. He qualified as a FIFA referee in 2010 and worked in the 2011 CIS Cup.

Pettay died in the crash of RusAir Flight 9605 at Besovets, near Petrozavodsk.

References

1973 births
People from the Republic of Karelia
2011 deaths
Russian football referees
Victims of aviation accidents or incidents in Russia